The 2017 Pan American Women's Handball Championship was the 14th edition of the Pan American Women's Handball Championship, held in at the Sociedad Alemana de Gimnasia de Villa Ballester, in Buenos Aires Province, Argentina from 18 to 25 June 2017. It acted as American qualifying tournament for the 2017 World Women's Handball Championship.
The event was originally set to be held in Toronto, Canada but the Canadian Handball Federation withdrew, citing lack of funds.

Brazil defeated Argentina 38–20 to capture their 10th title.

Qualified teams

Preliminary round
The schedule was announced on 16 May 2017, with the exact throw-off times being published on 2 June 2017.

All times are local (UTC−3).

Group A

Group B

Knockout stage

Bracket

5–8th place bracket

5–8th place semifinals

Semifinals

Ninth place game

Seventh place game

Fifth place game

Third place game

Final

Final ranking

Awards
All-star team
Goalkeeper:  Bárbara Arenhart
Right Wing:  Jéssica Quintino
Right Back:  Manuela Pizzo
Playmaker:  Marizza Faría
Left Back:  Eduarda Amorim
Left Wing:  Samira Rocha
Pivot:  Antonela Mena

MVP:  Samira Rocha

References

External links
Official website
Results at todor66

2017 Women
Pan American Women's Handball Championship
International handball competitions hosted by Argentina
2017 in Argentine sport
June 2017 sports events in South America